The Yungang Grottoes, formerly the Wuzhoushan Grottoes, are ancient Chinese Buddhist temple grottoes near the city of Datong in the province of Shanxi. They are excellent examples of rock-cut architecture and one of the three most famous ancient Buddhist sculptural sites of China. The others are Longmen and Mogao.

The site is located about 16 km west of the city of Datong, in the valley of the Shi Li river at the base of the Wuzhou Shan mountains. They are an outstanding example of the Chinese stone carvings from the 5th and 6th centuries. There are 53 major caves, along with 51,000 niches housing the same number of Buddha statues. Additionally, there are around 1,100 minor caves. A Ming dynasty-era fort is still located on top of the cliff housing the Yungang Grottoes.

The grottoes were excavated in the south face of a sandstone cliff about 2600 feet long and 30 to 60 feet high. In 2001, the Yungang Grottoes were made a UNESCO World Heritage Site. The Yungang Grottoes are considered by UNESCO to be a "masterpiece of early Chinese Buddhist cave art... [and] ...represent the successful fusion of Buddhist religious symbolic art from south and central Asia with Chinese cultural traditions, starting in the 5th century CE under Imperial auspices." It is classified as a AAAAA scenic area by the China National Tourism Administration.

History

After the decline of the West Jin dynasty, the northern parts of China came under the control of the Tuoba-ruled Northern Wei. They made the city of Pingcheng (平城), now known as Datong (大同), their capital. Due to its promotion, Pingcheng saw an increase in construction work. The Northern Wei early adopted Buddhism as their state religion. Buddhism arrived in this location via travel on the ancient North Silk Road, the northernmost route of about 2600 kilometres in length, which connected the ancient Chinese capital of Xi'an to the west over the Wushao Ling Pass to Wuwei and emerging in Kashgar before linking to ancient Parthia.

The work on this first period of carving lasted until the year 465 AD, and these caves are now known as caves 16–20. Beginning around the year 471 AD, in a second construction phase that lasted until 494 AD, the twin caves 5/6, 7/8, and 9/10 as well as the caves 11, 12, and probably 13 were constructed under the supervision and support of the imperial court. The imperial patronage ended 494 AD with the move of the Wei court to the new capital of Luoyang. All other caves emerged under private patronage in a third construction period, lasting until 525, when the construction came to a final halt due to uprisings in the area.

Deterioration and Conservation 
Since the end of the works, the sandstone of the grottoes has been exposed to heavy weathering. Many of the grottoes are exposed to the open air, and are therefore vulnerable to various forms of pollution and deterioration.  Windblown dust and air pollution from the industrial city of Datong, as well as dust from mines and highways near the site pose a threat to the preservation of the ancient statues.  The site is also in proximity of the Gobi Desert, the storms of which can contribute to the decay of the statues. The ensuing centuries therefore saw several attempts to preserve the caves and to repair sustained damage. During the Liao dynasty the caves saw some renewing of statues and, from 1049 to 1060, the buildup of the "10 temples of Yungang", which were meant to protect the main caves. However, they were destroyed again some 60 years later in a fire. The wooden buildings extant in front of caves 5 and 6 were constructed in 1621, during the early Qing dynasty. Since the 1950s, cracks in the sandstone have been sealed by grouting, and forestation has been implemented in an effort to reduce the weathering due to sandstorms. During the Cultural Revolution, Red Guards damaged many of the carvings, and bullet marks are still visible to observers. During April and May 1991, Caltech personnel conducted air pollutant measurement experiments in the Yungang Grottoes. It was found that nearly all of the airborne matter was mineral dust or carbon particles, allowing a focus of attention on sources of these kinds of matter.

Cave 6 
Cave 6 is one of the richest of the Yungang sites.  It was constructed between 465 and 494 C.E. by Emperor Xiao Wen.  The cave's surface area is approximately 1,000 square meters.  The entire interior of the cave is carved and painted.  There is a stupa pillar in the center of the room extending from the floor to the ceiling.  The walls are divided into two stories.  The walls of the upper stories are host to carvings of standing Buddhas, Bodhisattvas, and monks among other celestial figures.  All of the carvings were painted, but because the caves have been repainted evidently up to twelve times, determining the original scheme is difficult.

Gallery

References

Further reading

 "The Oldest Buddhist Stone Monuments known to China - fifth-century sculptures at Wu Chou Shan", well-illustrated feature in The Illustrated London News, 10 October 1931.

External links

 Official website 
 UNESCO World Heritage page about Yungang Grottoes
 Protecting the Yungang Grottoes from Air Pollution Damage

Major National Historical and Cultural Sites in Shanxi
Chinese Buddhist grottoes
Buddhist temples in Shanxi
Buddhist pilgrimage sites in China
Sites along the Silk Road
World Heritage Sites in China
AAAAA-rated tourist attractions
Northern Wei
Datong